Bean Lake is a lake in Cottonwood County, in the U.S. state of Minnesota. The lake is several miles northwest of the town of Storden, Minnesota.

Bean Lake was named for Joseph F. Bean, an early settler.

References

Lakes of Minnesota
Lakes of Cottonwood County, Minnesota